Shadrach  by Meindert DeJong is a children's novel about a small boy and his pet rabbit. The novel, illustrated by Maurice Sendak, was first published in 1953 and was a Newbery Honor recipient in 1954.

Plot summary
The novel is set in the Netherlands. 6-year-old Davie waits a long time for his pet, a black rabbit he calls Shadrach. When the rabbit finally comes, every day seems miraculous. But one day Shadrach runs away.

References

1953 American novels
American children's novels
Newbery Honor-winning works
Novels by Meindert DeJong
Books illustrated by Maurice Sendak
Children's novels about animals
Harper & Brothers books
1953 children's books